Mir Rud Posht (also Romanized as Mīr Rūd Posht and Mīrūd Posht) is a village in Ganjafruz Rural District, in the Central District of Babol County, Mazandaran Province, Iran. At the 2006 census, its population was 1,339, in 362 families.

References 

Populated places in Babol County